Carl Pontus Wikner (19 May 1837 – 16 May 1888) was a famed Swedish lecturer in philosophy and professor of aesthetics in Oslo (Christiania) from 1884.

Wikner's contribution to homosexual history consists foremostly of producing the first description of the problematics about homosexual identity and the coming-out process. He deposited for future research at the medical faculty in Uppsala his Psychological Self-Confessions from 1879 and diaries from 1853 to 1871. According to his own wishes, they were not published before his wife and sons - the nearest members of the family - had died.

Biography
Wikner was the son of the mill inspector Peter Wikner and his wife Sara Larsson. He grew up at the Barracks in Foss parish. There, the local community association has restored Pontus Wiknergården and uses it as a local community farm. At the age of three and a half, he learned to read. At the age of seven, he threw himself into biblical history in German and within a few more years he was immersed in English and Latin grammar. In the summer of 1871 he married his childhood friend Ida Weinberg (1837–1910). They had two sons, Ernst and Hugo. For Wikner, the marriage was a marriage of convenience, because he was gay.

After studying at Uppsala University, he became an associate professor of theoretical philosophy and senior lecturer there. In 1884 he was appointed professor of philosophy at Christiania University and took up this chair the following year.

Towards the end of his life, Wikner wrote that he was suffering from four chronic ailments. One of them - too big a heart - he did not mention without a certain pride. He died just before he turned 51 years old. Wikner is buried in Uppsala's old cemetery. In 1902, a grave was unveiled that was erected in his honor, when a speech was given by J.A. Eklund, later bishop of Karlstad diocese.

Philosophy
As a philosopher, Wikner was influenced by Christopher Jacob Boström, but asserted his own independent view, partly in scholarly writings, partly also in more popular, rarely well-written works. Among the latter are a series of philosophical and religious lectures, such as The Sacrifice of Culture, The Narcissus Saga and some historical novels influenced by Viktor Rydberg's style art, excellent for richness of thought, beauty of form and a warm religious spirit: My mother's testament, Mantegna's angel.

Wikner was a member of the Nameless Society. Wikner's melancholy but eternally trusting writing has had a far-reaching and profound influence. He also had a Christian creed.

The Diaries
The Swedish gay movement has seen an early role model in Pontus Wikner. His private notes and diaries were compiled into the work Psychological Self-Confessions, which was published posthumously in 1971. In these diaries he reveals his homosexual orientation.

References
 "Tanker og Spørgesmaal for Menneskerns Søns Aasyn" by Sofus Thormodsæter, Kristiania, 1889.

1837 births
1888 deaths
Swedish LGBT people
Swedish philosophers
Uppsala University alumni
Academic staff of the University of Oslo
Burials at Uppsala old cemetery